Holcombe Rogus is a village and civil parish in the English county of Devon. In 2001 the population of the parish was 503. The northern boundary of the parish forms part of the county boundary with Somerset and clockwise from the east it is bordered by the Devon parishes of Culmstock, Burlescombe, Sampford Peverell, and Hockworthy.

The first element of the place-name is derived from Old English for a deep or hollow coomb (valley) and the second element refers to the holder of the land – at the time of the Domesday Book (1086) the tenant was Rogo or Rogus.

The manor house known as Holcombe Court was built by the Bluett family. It is situated to the immediate west of the parish church, hidden behind a high boundary wall, and was described by W. G. Hoskins as "perhaps the finest Tudor house in Devon".

The parish church is dedicated to All Saints and is predominantly 15th-century. It contains several monuments to the Bluett family, including the 1615 tomb of Richard Bluett, his wife, Mary and their eleven children. There are also several mural monuments of the 18th century.

By 1812, progress was being made with the construction of the Grand Western Canal, but it was hampered by rock cuttings at Holcombe Rogus, from which springs of water gushed, and there was a need to line some sections with puddle clay to prevent leakage. Lime kilns were constructed to provide the materials, which can still be seen beside the canal, close to the Waytown Tunnel.

Notable people
 Ryan Searle, darts player

References

External links 

Details
GENUKI(tm) page

Villages in Devon
Grand Western Canal
Lime kilns in England